Hassan Ghalibaf Asl (was born 1969 in Maragheh, East Azerbaijan) is an Iranian academic, economist, Jurist, scholar and former CEO of Tehran Stock Exchange.

Notes

External links
 

Living people
University of Tehran alumni
People from Maragheh
1969 births
Iranian chief executives
Iranian economists